Norwegian supercentenarians are citizens, residents or emigrants from Norway who have attained or surpassed 110 years of age. The Gerontology Research Group (GRG) has validated the longevity claims of 17 Norwegian supercentenarians, including 12 residents and 5 emigrants. The oldest known Norwegian person was Maren Bolette Torp, who died in 1989, aged 112 years, 61 days. The oldest Norwegian man ever was Herman Smith-Johannsen, credited for introducing cross-country skiing to Canada and North America, who lived 111 years, 204 days between 1875 and 1987.

Oldest Norwegian people ever 
The list including known and validated supercentenarians who died before 2015 was compiled by the Gerontology Research Group (GRG). Later cases were sourced either from more recent GRG data, from administrative reports or from press coverage, as indicated in the table.

Notes

References 

Norwegian
supercentenarians